Friedrich Wilhelm Theodor Heyser (September 12, 1857 in Gnoien – September 7, 1921 in Dresden) was a German portrait, landscape, and history painter.

Life 
Friedrich Heyser studied from 1880 to 1883 at the Academy of Fine Arts in Dresden as a student of Leon Pohle and Paul Mohn. From 1883 to 1885, he studied with Ferdinand Keller at the Academy of Fine Arts in Karlsruhe. In 1890 he briefly attended the Académie Julian in Paris. He lived and worked in Berlin, Bad Harzburg, and Dresden.

Heyser was a member of the Allgemeine Deutsche Kunstgenossenschaft and the artist group Grün-Weiss, formed around 1910. Green and white are the state colors of Saxony. The Grün-Weiß group, as a progressive group within the Dresden Art Cooperative, presented their works from October 29, 1910, in the Emil Richter Art Salon. Members of the Grün-Weiß group included painters Max Frey, Josef Goller, Georg Jahn, Walther Illner, Georg Lührig, Max Pietschmann, Paul von Schlippenbach, Bernhard Schröter, Johann Walter-Kurau, sculptors Richard Guhr, Hans Hartmann-McLean, Heinrich Wedemeyer, and architects Rudolf Bitzan, Georg Heinsius von Mayenburg, and Martin Pietzsch. From today's perspective, the Grün-Weiß was a moderate attempt to bring movement into the conservative structures of the Dresden Art Cooperative.

Works 
Friedrich Heyser created numerous portraits of well-known personalities as well as genre-like depictions, often based on German poetry. In the last years of his life he created some landscape paintings u. a. from the island of Föhr and from Friesland.

Portraits

 1886: Gustav zu Putlitz
 Friedrich von Bodenstedt
 1888: Joseph Joachim
 1890: Hermann Wislicenus
 1895 (circa): Julius Stinde
 1898 (approx.): Georg Schumann
 1906 (circa): Claire von Glümer
 1906: Prince Albert of Prussia
 1909: Richard_Schleinitz
 1910 (circa): Armbruster (sculptor)
 Adolf Fischer-Gurig
 Prince and Princess Johann Georg of Saxony

Genre-like depictions

 1886: The Fisherman (after Goethe)
 1887: Der Blumen Rache (after Freiligrath)
 1891: The Peri at Heaven's Gate
 Gloria in Excelsis
 1900 (circa): Ophelia

Awards 

 Prize of the Academic Senate for the execution of two murals in the meeting room of the Gewandhaus in Bautzen (ex aequo Georg Schwenk). 
 1901: Small golden plaquette, International Art Exhibition Dresden 1901.

Literature 
 Ernst Sigismund :  . In: Hans Vollmer (ed.): Founded by Ulrich Thieme and Felix Becker . tape 17 : Heubel–Hubard . EA Seemann, Leipzig 1924, p. 41 .
 Heyser, Friedrich. In: Friedrich Jansa: German artists in words and pictures. Verlag Friedrich Jansa, Leipzig 1912, p. 264 with ill.
 Hermann Alexander Müller, Hans Wolfgang Singer :  . In:  . 3rd Edition. 2nd volume, 1st half. Rütten & Luenning, Frankfurt am Main 1896, p. 176 ( Text Archive - Internet Archive ).
 Heyser, Friedrich. In: Friedrich von Boetticher: Painting works of the 19th century. contribution to art history. Volume 1/2, sheet 31-61: Heideck-Mayer, Louis. Mrs. v. Boetticher's Verlag, Dresden 1895, p. 530 ( text archive - Internet Archive ).

References 

19th-century German painters
19th-century German male artists
1857 births
1921 deaths
German history painters
German portrait painters
German landscape painters
German male painters